Supplement or Supplemental may refer to:

Health and medicine
 Bodybuilding supplement
 Dietary supplement
 Herbal supplement

Media
 Supplement (publishing), a publication that has a role secondary to that of another preceding or concurrent publication
 Supplement (album), by Ai Nonaka
 The Supplement, a 2002 Polish film
 In literary theory, an idea of Jacques Derrida from Of Grammatology
 Supplement, a role-playing or tabletop game expansion pack

Other uses
 Supplement, one of a pair of supplementary angles, considered relative to the other

See also
 Supplementary (disambiguation)
 Supply (disambiguation)